Ralph Edwin Reed (October 18, 1890 in Beaver, Pennsylvania – February 16, 1959) was a professional third baseman who played for the Newark Pepper of the Federal League in its 1915 season.

Reed played college baseball at both Dartmouth College and Princeton University.

References

Sources

External links 
 

1890 births
1959 deaths
Dartmouth College alumni
Major League Baseball third basemen
Newark Peppers players
Baseball players from Pennsylvania
People from Beaver, Pennsylvania
Princeton Tigers baseball players
Troy Trojans (minor league) players